Sililo "Joe" Figota Manuele (born 5 December 1965) is a male boxer from Samoa. He was born in Faleapuna village in the Va'a-o-Fonoti district at the north east of Upolu island.

He competed in the 1990 Commonwealth Games for Western Samoa, where he won a bronze medal for boxing in the Men's Light Middleweight class.  He then competed at the 1992 Summer Olympics for New Zealand.

External links
 
 
 

1965 births
Samoan male boxers
Olympic boxers of New Zealand
Boxers at the 1992 Summer Olympics
Boxers at the 1990 Commonwealth Games
Commonwealth Games bronze medallists for Samoa
People from Va'a-o-Fonoti
Living people
New Zealand male boxers
Samoan emigrants to New Zealand
Commonwealth Games medallists in boxing
Light-middleweight boxers
Medallists at the 1990 Commonwealth Games